Sterile male plants are plants which are incapable of producing pollen. This is sometimes attributed to mutations in the mitochondrial DNA which affects the Tapetum cells in anthers which are responsible for nursing developing pollen. The mutations cause the breakdown of the mitochondria in these specific cells and result in cell death and so pollen production is interrupted. These observations have now led to transgenic sterile male plants to be made in order to create hybrid seeds, by inserting transgenes which are specifically poisonous to Tapetum cells.

Plant reproduction